Raymond Wilkes McKinnon (born November 15, 1957) is an American actor, screenwriter, film director and producer. He is best known for the roles of H.W. Smith in Deadwood (2004) and Lincoln Potter in Sons of Anarchy (2011) and Mayans M.C. (2018–2021), and for his film roles in Apollo 13 (1995), O Brother, Where Art Thou? (2000), and the Oscar-winning short The Accountant (2001).

Early life and education
McKinnon was born on November 15, 1957 and grew up in Adel, Georgia, the son of Raymond McKinnon, a car dealer, and his wife Dorothy McKinnon. He attended local schools.

In 1981, McKinnon graduated with a degree in theatre from Valdosta State University.

Career 
McKinnon began acting and later directed. As an actor, he is best known for his role as Reverend Smith in the HBO series Deadwood, which ran from 2004 to 2006, a total of three seasons and 36 episodes. He is also known for his role as Lincoln Potter in the fourth season of the FX show Sons of Anarchy and its spin-off series Mayans M.C.

He founded Ginny Mule Pictures, a production company, with his wife (deceased) Lisa Blount, an actress and producer, and Walton Goggins. Together the trio won the Academy Award in 2001 in the category Live Action Short Film for The Accountant, which they produced with their company.

McKinnon wrote, produced, directed and played 'Snake' in the 2004 film Chrystal, starring Blount and Billy Bob Thornton. The supporting cast included Goggins, Grace Zabriskie, Harry Lennix, Harry Dean Stanton and Johnny Galecki.

He wrote and directed the television series Rectify, the first original series from SundanceTV, featuring a man released from Georgia state prison after 19 years on death row, and it explores the effects on him, his family and his small town. Aden Young stars as Daniel Holden. The first season was broadcast from April to May 2013, and the fourth and final season ended in December 2016. The series won a Peabody Award in 2013.

Personal life
McKinnon was married to Lisa Blount, an actress and producer, from 1998 to her death in 2010.  He currently lives in Little Rock, Arkansas, the hometown of Blount.

Filmography

Film

Television

Awards and nominations

References

External links

1957 births
American male film actors
American male television actors
Directors of Live Action Short Film Academy Award winners
Living people
Male actors from Georgia (U.S. state)
People from Cook County, Georgia
Valdosta State University alumni
Film directors from Georgia (U.S. state)